WLVB (93.9 FM, "Vermont Country 93.9") is a radio station licensed to serve Morrisville, Vermont.  The station is owned by Radio Vermont, Inc.  It airs a country music format.

The station has been assigned these call letters by the Federal Communications Commission since February 22, 1991.

References

External links
WLVB official website

LVB
Country radio stations in the United States